A. Mazing Monsters is a series of 16 children's books by Jim Slater first published in 1979.

Characters
 Mr A. Mazing
 Mr A. Stonishing
 Mr A. Musing
 Mr A. Larm
 Mr Grubb

Books
 The Tricky Troggle
 Wormball
 Webfoot
 The Great Gulper
 Greeneye
 The Winkybird
 Dimmo
 Bignose
 Swiggo
 Snuggly
 Big Snowy
 Kleenum
 Grinno
 Rainbow
 Crammus
 Send For The Gulper

References

External links
 A. Mazing Monsters official site

British picture books
Series of children's books